May v. Burdett, 9 Q.B. 101 (1846), was an English case argued decided before the Queen's Bench that ruled a plaintiff injured by a dangerous animal kept by the defendant had a prima facie case for negligence even without a showing that the defendant had been negligent in securing the animal.

Case law
Butterfield v Forrester
Davies v Mann
Paris v Stepney BC
Winterbottom v Wright

References

Negligence case law
English tort case law
1846 in case law
1846 in British law
Court of King's Bench (England) cases